Kelly Packwood (born 1986) is a Welsh international lawn & indoor bowler.

Bowls career
In 2012, she won the Hong Kong International Bowls Classic pairs title with Judith Wason.

Kelly represented Wales at the 2014 Commonwealth Games and only just missed out on a bronze medal losing out to South Africa in the bronze medal play off in the Women's triples with Kathy Pearce and Lisa Forey.

Her best performance indoors was reaching the semi finals of the 2013 World Indoor Bowls Championship.

Personal life
Her twin sister is fellow international bowler Kerry Packwood.

References

1986 births
Living people
Welsh female bowls players
Bowls players at the 2014 Commonwealth Games
Commonwealth Games competitors for Wales